Clyde Troutt (August 23, 1901 - October, 1979) was an American trainer of Thoroughbred racehorses. From Benton, Illinois, on March 15, 1938 Troutt replaced Frank Hackett as one of the trainers of the prominent John and Fannie Hertz stable. For his own account, he claimed Take Wing in early July 1942 for $3,000  and who would then earn more than $160,000 and set a new North American record for a mile and three-sixteenths on turf.

Triple Crown races
Among Troutt's other successful horses was  Royal Bay Gem (b. 1950). The colt won five stakes races in 1953 including the Everglades Stakes and Jersey Stakes. After finishing fourth to half-brother Dark Star in the Kentucky Derby, he defeated Dark Star in the Preakness Prep  before finishing third to Native Dancer in both the Preakness Stakes and Belmont Stakes. Troutt also trained Advocator who ran second to Kauai King in the 1966 Kentucky Derby.

In October 1958 Clyde Troutt entered into his most successful arrangement when he signed on as the head trainer for the racing stable Dan and Ada Rice, owners of Danada Farm in Wheaton in DuPage County, Illinois and its satellite farm near Lexington, Kentucky.

References

1901 births
1979 deaths
American horse trainers
People from Benton, Illinois